Tortricidia is a genus of moths of the family Limacodidae. It was described by Alpheus Spring Packard in 1864.

Species
Tortricidia testacea Packard, 1864
Tortricidia pallida (Herrich-Schäffer, 1854)
Tortricidia flexuosa (Grote, 1880)

References 

Limacodidae genera
Limacodidae
Taxa named by Alpheus Spring Packard